Margovula anulata is a species of sea snail, a marine gastropod mollusk in the family Ovulidae, the ovulids, cowry allies or false cowries.

Description
The shell size varies between 8 mm and 22 mm

Distribution
This species is distributed along the Philippines.

References

External links
 

Ovulidae
Gastropods described in 2001